Hakea platysperma, commonly known as the cricket ball hakea, is a shrub in the family Proteaceae. It has long, sharply pointed, needle-shaped leaves and fragrant cream-reddish flowers in clusters from July to October. It is endemic to the south west of Western Australia.

Description
The branchlets and young leaves are covered with rusty coloured, flattened, smooth  hairs. Sweetly scented creamy reddish to yellow flowers appear in profusion in axillary racemes.

Taxonomy and naming
Cricket ball hakea was first formally described in 1842 by Joseph Dalton Hooker and the description was published in his book Icones Plantarum. The specific epithet (platysperma) is derived from the Ancient Greek platy - wide, and sperma - seed, referring to the large, circular fruit.

Distribution and habitat
Hakea platysperma grows in sand, sandy clay and occasionally over laterite in the Avon Wheatbelt, Coolgardie, Geraldton Sandplains and Mallee biogeographic regions of Western Australia.

Conservation status
Hakea platysperma is classified as "not threatened" by the Western Australian Government.

Cultivation
The main horticultural appeal of this species is the giant woody seed pods, which have been used in cut flower arrangements. H. platysperma can be grown in a sunny position in well-drained soil.

References

platysperma
Eudicots of Western Australia
Plants described in 1842
Taxa named by Joseph Dalton Hooker